Ilija Bozoljac and Igor Zelenay won the title, defeating Mirza Bašić and Nikola Mektić in the final 6–0, 6–3 .

Seeds

Draw

Draw

References
 Main Draw

Trofeo Citta di Brescia - Doubles
Trofeo Città di Brescia